Luis Fuentes Rodríguez (born 20 December 1960) is a Spanish politician of the Citizens party. He was a member of the Cortes of Castile and León from 2015 to 2022, serving as the legislature's president from 2019.

Biography
Born in Salamanca, Fuentes graduated in Business Sciences from the University of Salamanca. A specialist in marketing, he worked for 18 years for a furniture company. He was the president of the localist Union of the Salamancan People (UPSa), which merged into the national party Citizens in 2014.

In March 2015, Fuentes secured enough signatures to be Citizens' lead candidate in the 2015 Castilian-Leonese regional election; he ran in the Valladolid constituency. His party entered the Cortes of Castile and León with five seats after taking 10.3% of the vote.

After the 2019 elections, Citizens agreed to form government with the People's Party (PP). As per this agreement, Fuentes was the two parties' candidate for President of the Cortes and was elected.

Towards the end of 2021, President of the Junta of Castile and León, Alfonso Fernández Mañueco, dissolved the PP's pact with Citizens and called new elections. Citizens' vote share fell and they only had one candidate elected, leader Francisco Igea, meaning that Fuentes lost his seat.

References

1960 births
Living people
People from Salamanca
University of Salamanca alumni
Citizens (Spanish political party) politicians
Members of the 9th Cortes of Castile and León
Members of the 10th Cortes of Castile and León
Presidents of the Cortes of Castile and León